Nicole Callisto (born 12 November 1987 in Joondalup, Western Australia) is an Australian BMX cyclist who represented Australia at the 2008 Summer Olympics in Beijing. She began riding when she was three and won the 2005 Junior World BMX Championships.
Callisto has been under contract with Free Agent Bicycles for the Free Agent World BMX Team since the 2006 BMX racing season.

Callisto currently lives in the Sydney, Australia area, and frequently travels out of country to compete in international BMX events called "world(s)" events.

References
 Australian Olympic Committee profile

External links
 
 
 
 

1987 births
Living people
BMX riders
Australian female cyclists
Olympic cyclists of Australia
Cyclists at the 2008 Summer Olympics
Sportswomen from Western Australia
Cyclists from Perth, Western Australia